(English: Reports of Many Principal Cases Argued and Adjudged in the Time of Queen Elizabeth, in the Common Bench) is the title of a collection of nominate reports, by Sir Edmund Anderson, of cases decided by the Court of Common Pleas between approximately 1534 and 1605. For the purpose of citation their name may be abbreviated to "And". They are in two volumes. Both volumes are reprinted in volume 123 of the English Reports.

In 1847, J. G. Marvin said:

References
Anderson, E. Les Reports des mults principals cases en le temps del jadis roign Eliz., cibien en le common bank, come devant touts les Judges de cest Roialme. 2 Parts. Fol. London 1664 to 1665.

Sets of reports reprinted in the English Reports
Court of Common Pleas (England)